Tropidophis hendersoni, commonly known as the Cuban khaki dwarf boa, is a species of snake in the family Tropidophiidae (dwarf boas). The species is endemic to the West Indies.

Etymology
The specific name, hendersoni, is in honor of American herpetologist Robert William Henderson (born 1945).

Geographic range
T. hendersoni is known from the northern coast of eastern Cuba, in the province of Holguín.

Description
T. hendersoni is a small spotted species, previously confused with T. haetianus of Hispaniola.

References

Further reading
Hedges SB, Garrido OH  (2002).  "A new snake of the genus Tropidophis (Tropidophiidae) from Eastern Cuba".  Journal of Herpetology 36: 157–161. (Tropidophis hendersoni, new species).

Tropidophiidae
Reptiles of the Caribbean
Endemic fauna of Cuba
Reptiles described in 2002